Avalanche is the third album by Some Velvet Sidewalk.

Track listing
"Avalanche"
"Loch Ness"
"Curiosity"
"Froggy"
"Peaches"
"Little Wishes"
"Deep Sea Green"
"No Real Home"
"Alien"
"Right/Wrong"
"Ice Cream Overdrive"

References

Some Velvet Sidewalk albums
Albums produced by Steve Fisk
K Records albums
1992 albums